Swatis (Urdu: سواتی, Pashto: سواتي) are a Pashtun tribe, mostly inhabiting the Hazara Division of the Khyber Pakhtunkhwa province in Pakistan. They are mostly agricultural and are the biggest land owning tribe in the districts of Mansehra and Batagram (Feudal Tanawal excluded). Swatis are divided into four major tribal clans: Gabri (گبری), Mitravi (متراوی), Mumyaali (ممیالی) and Toar (ٹوڑ). Some of them speak Hindko in towns like Mansehra, Balakot, Naran, Kaghan and Garhi Habibullah while majority of them speak Pashto as a mother tongue. Their code of conduct and customs are similar to Pashtunwali, and are called Swatiwali. Swatis are sometimes referred to as Suwadis and Servatis. Most of them are orthodox Muslims, and have been Muslim since Ghaznavid times. They are staunch followers of the Hanafi school of Islamic jurisprudence.

According to the 1911 Census Report, the tribe was counted as having 33,000 individuals in Hazara District alone, excluding the independent territory of Battagram, then known as Hazara Agency.

Subsections and their locations

Swatis have the following subsections, holding land share given against each (in British territory only prior to Independence of Pakistan):

Gabri in Upper Pakhli

 Khankhel (adoption) (2) Nimakai land collectively in areas of Garhi Habibullah, Mansehra and Bherkund.
 Sarkheli (2) Nimakai land collectively in areas Baffa, Balakot and Shinkiari.
 Mirs including (a) Dodaal (1) Nimakai collectively in areas Shinkiari, Kaghan, Balakot and Bhogarmang (b) Panjghol (1) Nimakai collectively in areas Shinkiari and Kaghan (c) Panjmiraal (1) Nimakai in area Shinkiari.
 Deshraaes including (a) Jahangiri (1) Nimakai collectively in areas Mansehra and Bhogarmang (b) 
 Arghushaals  (1) Nimakai collectively in areas Dhodial , Shinkiari ,Garhi Habibillah , and Kaghan .
 Iznaali/Mandravi (1) Nimakai in area Konsh.

Mitravi in Lower Pakhli

Ali Sheris (3) Nimakais collectively in the areas of Sherpur, Malakpur, Gidarpur, Tarihya. This tribe is further divided into (a) Khankhel Balasuri (unrelated to Khankhels of Garhi Habibullah) (b) Jalangiaal (c) Ranisiaal.
 Beegaal (3) Nimakais in the area of Agror. This tribe is further subdivided into (a) Shamkori (b) Chojayee.
Mumyaali (6) Nimakais collectively in areas of Trangi Sabir Shah, Khaki, Gulibagh, Nakot and Tikri. This tribe is further divided into (a) Sharor (b) Rabati (c) Panjkora (d) Shilmani (e) Ashlor  (f) Naror (g) Toor Malakaal (h) Deshaan.

 Toar is the tribe that was located in then Independent Territory, now mostly under Battagram district. Therefore, it was not surveyed in 1872. This area also included Allai which is a tehsil of Batagram District in Pakistan's Khyber-Pakhtunkhwa province.

References

Further reading
 Baburnama by Emperor Zaheeruddin Babar translated by Beveridge, Annette Susannah, 1842-1929. A detailed version of Mir Haidar Ali Gabri Swati of Bajawar, Sultan Awais Swati and Sultan Aliuddin Swati.
 Tajik Swati and Gabr by Prof. Akhtar 
 Story of Swat as told by Miangul Abdul Wadood Badshah by Asif Khan. History of Swati Tribe and Swat at general.
 Ethnogenesis and History of Swatis by Arif Hasan 
 Imperial Gazetteer of India P 319 
 History of the Pathans Vol. III by Brig. Haroon Rashid (R). 
 The Kingdom of Swat Gibar by Akhunzada Arif Hasan Khan

 Further Swati Insights from my Y DNA by Arif Hasan Khan

Social groups of Pakistan
Pakistani names
Ethnic groups in Afghanistan
Mansehra District
Battagram District